Brend is a surname. Notable people with the surname include:

Thomas Brend ( 1516–1598), owner of the land on which the Globe Theatre was built
Nicholas Brend ( 1560–1601), owner of the Globe Theatre
Matthew Brend (1600–1659), owner of the Globe Theatre

See also
Brenn